Walter Bucher (born 8 June 1926) is a Swiss retired cyclist. He competed in the team pursuit event at the 1948 Summer Olympics. Between 1955 and 1959 he won a medal at every UCI Motor-paced World Championships, including a gold medal in 1958.  He also won five national titles in motor-paced racing (1955, 1957–1960).

Bucher was also a successful road cyclist, winning 11 six-day races out of 66. He missed the 1961 UCI Track World Championships in his native Zurich due to a bad fall earlier that year. Next year he stopped with cycling and founded a shipping company. He retired in 1992 due to an accident at work.

References

1926 births
Living people
Swiss male cyclists
Cyclists from Zürich
Olympic cyclists of Switzerland
Cyclists at the 1948 Summer Olympics
UCI Track Cycling World Champions (men)
Swiss track cyclists